
Gmina Wijewo is a rural gmina (administrative district) in Leszno County, Greater Poland Voivodeship, in west-central Poland.

The gmina contains part of the protected area called Przemęt Landscape Park.

Villages
Gmina Wijewo contains the villages and settlements of Brenno, Filipowo, Kalek, Miastko, Potrzebowo, Przylesie, Radomyśl, Siedmiórki, Wijewo, Wilanów and Zaborówiec.

Neighbouring gminas
Gmina Wijewo is bordered by the gminas of Przemęt, Sława, Włoszakowice and Wschowa.

References
Polish official population figures 2006
Official gmina website
Independent information service of the municipality of Wijewo

Wijewo
Leszno County